The common jery (Neomixis tenella) is a species of bird in the family Cisticolidae.
It is endemic to Madagascar.

Its natural habitats are subtropical or tropical dry forest and subtropical or tropical moist lowland forest.

It was first described in 1866 by Gustav Hartlaub.

References

common jery
common jery
Taxonomy articles created by Polbot